Khalapur taluka is a taluka in Raigad district of Maharashtra. The headquarters of the taluka is Khalapur village. This taluka belongs to the Karjat sub-division, and comprises 130 villages, 5 revenue circles and 25 sajas. 56 villages of this taluka come under NAINA. Khalapur toll naka is one of the busiest tolls in the state as it serves as an important transit point for goods from the Nhava Sheva port to automative and industrial belt of Pimpri Chinchwad.

Raigad district
As of August 2015, there are 8 sub-divisions, 15 talukas, 1970 villages, 60 revenue circles and 350 sazzas in Raigad district.
The talukas being 
Alibag, 
Karjat, 
Khalapur, Mahad, 
Mangaon, 
Mhasala, 
Murud, 
Panvel, 
Pen, 
Poladpur, 
Roha, 
Shrivardhan, 
Sudhagad Pali, 
Tala and Uran.

Industries in Khalapur taluka
 Khopoli Power House.
 IOC
 Alta
 MUSCO

Tourist attractions and pilgrimage centres
 Adlabs Imagica.
 Varadvinayak Ashtavinayak temple.
 Ashram (math) of Gagangiri Maharaj.

References

Talukas in Maharashtra